Berta Golob (born 9 August 1932) is a Slovene writer and poet, a retired teacher and librarian.

Golob was born in Struževo which is now part of Kranj in 1932. She studied Slavistics at the University of Ljubljana and worked as a teacher and librarian. She is a prolific writer of children's books, in recent years mostly on religious subjects and has also published four poetry collections that also have a religious theme.

In 1982 she won the Levstik Award for her book Žive besede (Living Words).

Selected published works 
Sovražim vas (I Hate You), 1976
Znani obrazi (Well Known Faces), 1980
Drobne zgodbe (Tiny Stories), 1980
Žive besede (Living Words), 1982
Skrinja iz babičine bale (The Chest from Grandma's Dowry), 1983
Srce ustvarja, roka piše: srečanja z mladinskimi pisatelji (The Heart Creates, the Hand Writes: Meetings with Youth Writers), 1983
Sporočanje v Ptičjem logu (Informing in Birds Wood), 1984
Jezikovni vozli (Tongue Twisters), 1988
Igrarije, besedne čarovnije (Playful Magic of Words), 1988
Kako visoko je nebo (How High Is The Sky?), 1990
Šolske razglednice (School Postcards), 1990
Kažipotja med šolo in domom (Roadsigns from School to Home), 1990
Med nama, Gospod (Between Us, Lord), 1992
Dežela Slovničarija (The World of Grammar), 1992
O nerodovitni smokvi (On the Fruitless Fig Tree), 1994
O bahavem in skromnem možu (On the Boastful and the Humble Man), 1994
O sejalcu in semenu (On the Sower and the Seeds), 1994
K blagoslovu nesejo veseli (They Go Happily to the Blessing), 1994
Sveti Miklavž: pobarvanka (Saint Nicholas: A Colouring Book), 1994
Pastirica Urška (Urška the Shepherdess), 1994
Do zvezd in nazaj (To the Stars and Back), 1995
Slovnica, odčarana čarovnica (Grammar the Enchanted Witch), 1995
Sveti Martin (Saint Martin), 1995
O izgubljenem sinu: svetopisemska prilika (On the Prodigal Son: a Biblical Parable), 1995
Anton Martin Slomšek (Anton Martin Slomšek), 1996
Daljna preteklost naše vasi (the Distant Past of Out Village), 1997
Bela žena, divji mož (White maiden, Wild Man), 1997
Sveti Frančišek, brat cvetic in živali (Saint Frances, Brother of Flowers and Animals), 1997
Škof Baraga (Bishop Baraga), 1997
Mati Terezija, dobri angel Kalkute (Mother Tereza, the Good Angel of Calcutta), 1998
Blaženi škof Anton Martin (The Blessed Bishop Anton Martin), 1998
Marija Pomagaj na Brezjah (Mary Help at Brezje), 1998
Senca svetlobe (The Shadow of Light), 1999
Kam ljudje hitijo? (Where Are People Rushing To), 1999
Sveti Jurij – Zeleni Jurij (Saint George – Green George), 1999
Marijine srajčke (Mary's Vests), 1999
Daljave prihodnosti (The Distances of the Future), 1999
Zrna dedove modrosti (Grains of Grandpa's Wisdom), 2000
Janez Krstnik (John the Baptist), 2000
Kam ta romar roma (Where Does the Pilgrim Go To), 2000
Z Gospodom na križevem potu (On the Way of the Cross with the Lord), 2000
Napisal je knjigo (He Wrote a Book), 2001
Pri nas je veselo: sedem igric za otroke (We Are Having Fun: Seven Games for Children), 2001
K sveti maši gremo (We Attend Holy Mass), 2002
Črna suknja: Friderik Irenej Baraga (The Black Cape: Frederic Baraga), 2002
Pod križem močna žena (A Strong Woman Under the Cross), 2002
Pogledi s hišnega praga (Views from the Doorstep), 2003
Skriti zaklad: premišljevanje skrivnosti rožnega venca (The Hidden Treasure: The Reflective Mysteries of the Rosary), 2003
Božič prihaja (Christmas is Coming), 2003
Bodi svetloba: krščanstvo – izročilo in sporočilo (Be the Light: Christianity – Tradition and Message), 2003
Sandale in sari: blažena Mati Terezija iz Kalkute (Sandals and the Sari: the Blessed Mother Tereza of Calcutta), 2004
Svetilniki (Beacons), 2006
Kje je sreča doma? (Where is Happiness at Home), 2007
Preprosto pismo v raj (A Limpe Letter to Paradise), 2008
Kruh življenja, miru in dobrote: sv. Elizabeta Avstroogrska: 800-letnica njenega rojstva (The Bread of Life, Peace and Kindness: Saint Elizabeth of Hungary: the 800th Anniversary of Her Birth), 2008
V zrcalu evharistije (Reflecting the Eucharist), 2009
Oče Damijan: misijonar, ki je objemal gobavce (Father Damian: the Missionary With the Lepers), 2009
Vse to se je zgodilo (All This Happened), 2009
Lastovka išče dom (The Swallow Seeks a Home), 2010
Mučenec Lojze Grozde: »jaz sem neskončno drevo« (The Martyr Lojze Grozde: "I Am an Infinite Tree"), 2010

References

Slovenian women poets
Slovenian poets
1932 births
Living people
Slovenian children's writers
Writers from Kranj
Levstik Award laureates
Slovenian librarians
University of Ljubljana alumni
Slovenian women children's writers
Women librarians
Slovenian educators